Michael Todd Bordick (born July 21, 1965) is an American retired professional baseball shortstop. He played in Major League Baseball from 1990 to 2003 with four teams: the Oakland Athletics, Baltimore Orioles, New York Mets, and Toronto Blue Jays.

Early life
Bordick's father, Michael, was in the Air Force, and his family moved frequently. Mike Bordick was born in Michigan and spent parts of his early childhood in Maine and in upstate New York before the family settled in Winterport, Maine, while he was in high school. He attended high school at Hampden Academy in Hampden, Maine along with longtime NASCAR veteran Ricky Craven. Bordick starred for the Hampden Academy Broncos and now the High School field is named in his honor.

Amateur career
Bordick attended the University of Maine, where he played college baseball for the Black Bears. In 1986, he played collegiate summer baseball in the Cape Cod Baseball League for the Yarmouth-Dennis Red Sox, and was signed by the Oakland Athletics and J.P. Ricciardi as an amateur free agent on July 10, 1986.

Professional career
Bordick made his Major League Baseball debut on April 11, 1990, with the Athletics. He signed with the Baltimore Orioles during the 1996 off season. The Orioles signed Bordick to take over at shortstop for Hall of Fame and Gold Glove shortstop Cal Ripken Jr., as Ripken moved to third base.

Bordick set records for most consecutive error-less games (110) and chances (543) by a shortstop.  He was selected to the 2000 All-Star Game. After an injury to the Mets' Rey Ordóñez, on July 28, 2000, Bordick was traded to the New York Mets for Melvin Mora, and minor leaguers Mike Kinkade, Pat Gorman and Lesli Brea. Bordick was a member of the 1997 Orioles team that lost in the American League Championship Series to the Cleveland Indians, and the New York Mets that lost the Subway Series to the New York Yankees in the 2000 World Series. Bordick also played briefly in the 1990 World Series against the Cincinnati Reds in a defensive role only.

Coaching and broadcasting career
Following the end of his playing career, Bordick worked as a roving minor league instructor for the Blue Jays.  In 2010, he rejoined the Orioles organization as the minor league offensive coordinator, and in 2011, he was the Orioles' temporary bullpen coach for several series. Since 2012 he has served as a part-time color analyst for Orioles telecasts on MASN, alternating games with Jim Palmer.
On January 26, 2021, Bordick was let go by MASN.

References

External links

1965 births
Living people
American expatriate baseball players in Canada
American League All-Stars
Baltimore Orioles announcers
Baltimore Orioles coaches
Baltimore Orioles players
Baseball players from Michigan
Bowie Baysox players
Delmarva Shorebirds players
Huntsville Stars players
Maine Black Bears baseball players
Major League Baseball bullpen coaches
Major League Baseball shortstops
Medford A's players
Modesto A's players
New York Mets players
Oakland Athletics players
People from Marquette, Michigan
People from Winterport, Maine
Sportspeople from Bangor, Maine
Tacoma Tigers players
Toronto Blue Jays players
Yarmouth–Dennis Red Sox players
Hampden Academy alumni